Cattleya percivaliana (literally Percival's Cattley's) is a species of orchid. It shares the common name of "Christmas Orchid" with C. trianae and Angraecum sesquipedale.  The diploid chromosome number of C. percivaliana has been determined as 2n = 40.  The haploid chromosome number has been determined as n = 20.

References

External links

percivaliana
percivaliana